Jeff Hilson (born 1966) is a British poet.  His works include A Grasses Primer (Form Books, 2000), Stretchers (Reality Street, 2006), Bird Bird (Landfill, 2009), and In The Assarts (Veer Books, 2010).  He also edited The Reality Street Book of Sonnets, published in 2008.  With Sean Bonney and David Miller he co-founded Crossing the Line, a reading series based in London.

Hilson is the son of British diplomat Malcolm Hilson OBE, and brother of the environmental lawyer Professor Christopher Hilson of the University of Reading.  He was educated at Bedford School, where he was a boarder.  He went to Girton College, Cambridge in 1985 to read English literature.  He graduated in 1988 with a second class degree.  He plays cricket for the Energy Exiles Cricket Club.

See also

 British Poetry Revival

Further reading 
 Jeff Hilson, The Reality Street Book of Sonnets (ed.) and Stretchers at Reality Street Editions
 Jeff Hilson, Bird Bird at West House Books
 Jeff Hilson, Bird Bird at Landfill Press
 Edmund Hardy, Review of Stretchers
 Piers Hugill, An overview of contemporary British poetry since 1977
 Stephen Thompson, 'The Forlorn Ear of Jeff Hilson', Complicities: British Poetry 1945-2007 ed. Robin Purves and Sam Ladkin (Prague: Litteraria Pragensia, 2007)

External links 
  Energy Exiles Cricket Club profile of Hilson
 Jeff Hilson's blog
 Five stretchers at Great Works
 One stretcher at Kate Murr's Press
 Excerpt from In the Assarts at onedit
 Excerpt from Bird Bird at onedit
 Excerpt from Bird Bird at Robert Sheppard's blog
 Excerpt from Bird Bird at PFS Post
 Archive of the Now
 Claire Jones, Review of Stretchers at OCT
 Ron Silliman, Review of The Reality Street Book of Sonnets (ed. Jeff Hilson)
 Jow Lindsay, Miscellany Note 23/10/05, Bad Press Serials 5.X
 Last Night at the Foundry

British poets
Alumni of Girton College, Cambridge
1966 births
Living people
People educated at Bedford School
British male poets